Anshel Brusilow (August 14, 1928 – January 15, 2018) was an American violinist, conductor, and music educator at the collegiate level.

Early life and education
Brusilow was born in Philadelphia, Pennsylvania in 1928, the son of Ukrainian Jewish immigrants Leon and Dora Brusilow (see ). He began his violin study at the age of five with William Frederick Happich (1884–1959) and subsequently studied with Jani Szanto (1887–1977). Brusilow entered the Curtis Institute of Music when he was eleven and studied there with Efrem Zimbalist. Throughout most of his childhood and adolescence, he was known as "Albert Brusilow". Later, at the urging of his girlfriend (who would later become his wife), he returned to using his birth name, Anshel.

Brusilow attended the Philadelphia Musical Academy and at sixteen was the youngest conducting student ever accepted by Pierre Monteux. A 4th prize winner of the Jacques Thibaud-Marguerite Long Violin Competition in 1949, he performed as a soloist with numerous major orchestras in the United States.

Career

Violinist
From 1954–55, Brusilow was concertmaster and assistant conductor of the New Orleans Symphony under Alexander Hilsberg (1897–1961).  From 1955–59, he was associate concertmaster of the Cleveland Orchestra under George Szell.  And from 1959 to 1966, he was concertmaster of the Philadelphia Orchestra under Eugene Ormandy.

Acclaimed recordings featuring Brusilow with the Philadelphia Orchestra include Vivaldi's The Four Seasons, Rimsky-Korsakov's Scheherazade, and Strauss's Ein Heldenleben.

While serving as concertmaster of the Philadelphia Orchestra, Brusilow founded in 1961, and from 1961–65, conducted the Philadelphia Chamber Orchestra, an organization composed of musicians from the Philadelphia Orchestra. But December 1964, Brusilow announced his resignation as concertmaster, effective June 1966, over a dispute with the Orchestra Association forbidding players from forming independent musical groups.

Conductor
Brusilow, in 1965, founded, and from 1965–68, directed and conducted the Chamber Symphony of Philadelphia, which performed two and one-half 34-week seasons and recorded six records on RCA Victor. In 1968, the Chamber Symphony of Philadelphia folded under financial duress, attributed mostly to a lack of philanthropic support for a second orchestra in Philadelphia.

In 1970, Brusilow was appointed executive director and conductor of the Dallas Symphony Orchestra. He led the orchestra's first tours of Central and South America and started the pops series that the orchestra still performs to this day. In 1973, after a successful tour of Central and South America, Brusilow was summarily fired after the Symphony's board of directors came under censure when it became public that composers were paying to have their works performed.

He was the music director of the Richardson Symphony Orchestra in Richardson, Texas, from 1992 until his retirement from that position in 2012.

Music educator in higher education
Brusilow was Director of Orchestral Studies at North Texas State University (later known as the University of North Texas) from 1973 to 1982, and again at North Texas from 1989 to 2008.  Between 1982 and 1989 he held a similar post at Southern Methodist University in Dallas.

Brusilow retired from his professorship at North Texas in 2008.  Shortly before his retirement he conducted his final concert with the University of North Texas Symphony Orchestra on Wednesday, April 23, 2008, in the Winspear Performance Hall of the Murchison Performing Arts Center in Denton. A $1,000,000 endowment, which includes the creation of a faculty position, the Anshel Brusilow Chair in Orchestral Studies, was established in his honor.

Diplomas, awards, and professional affiliations

Brusilow's violin and bows 
Soon after becoming concertmaster of the Philadelphia Orchestra, Brusilow purchased a 1743 Guarneri del Gesu violin (Cozio 49626), which today is known as "The Brusilow."  The violin, reportedly, was once owned by the French violinist, Jacques Pierre Rode (1774–1830), who had been a court violinist to Napoleon.  The provenance also includes W.E. Hill & Sons; Arthur Beare (until 1929); Alfred Oppenheim Corbin (1874–1941), a Dutch-born London-then-New-York-investment-banker, amateur violinist, and serious collector of violins (1929 to 1931); Leo Reisman, who purchased it through Emil Herrmann (from 1931); Theodore Pitcairn, a philanthropist who purchased it through Rembert Wurlitzer (around 1953); Brusilow (1959 to 1966), then to its previous owner (name unknown). Brusilow acquired the violin, through an arrangement, from Pitcairn, who, with Brusilow standing at his side at William Moennig & Son in Philadelphia, wrote a check for $28,000.  Moennig, according to Brusilow, "threw in a Tourte bow for free," which Brusilow still owned in the late 1980s.  Brusilow wrote in his 2015 book, Shoot The Conductor: Too Close to Monteux, Szell, and Ormandy, that he also owned a John Dodd bow, and preferred it over the Tourte.

Discography

Family 
Brusilow parents, Leon Brusilow (né Leiser Brusilovsky; born 1897 Kremenchuk; naturalized 1927 ED Pa; died 1968) and Dora Brusilow (née Epstein; born 1902 Novorossiya; naturalized 1928 ED Pa; died 1977), married March 12, 1919. They immigrated to the United States, arriving with Anshel's brother, Nathan Brusilow (née Nachman Brusilow; 1920–2004), at the Port of New York July 22, 1922, aboard the SS Zeeland.

Brusilow married Marilyn Rae Dow December 23, 1951, in San Francisco. They had three children.

Notes and references

Notes

References

External links
 Discography at SonyBMG Masterworks
 Maestro Brusilow's website

See also 
 University of North Texas Symphony Orchestra

1928 births
2018 deaths
American conductors (music)
American male conductors (music)
University of North Texas College of Music faculty
Musicians from Dallas
Curtis Institute of Music alumni
Concertmasters
Concertmasters of the Philadelphia Orchestra
Musicians of the Philadelphia Orchestra
Long-Thibaud-Crespin Competition prize-winners
Musicians from Philadelphia
American people of Ukrainian-Jewish descent
Classical musicians from Texas
Classical musicians from Pennsylvania
Male classical violinists
Jewish classical violinists